Astrocaryum aculeatissimum (syn. Astrocaryum ayri Mart., Toxophoenix aculeatissima Schott) is a palm native to Atlantic Coast restingas vegetation, which is an ecosystem of Atlantic Forest biome in Brazil. This plant has a commercial value because it has useful fibers which may be used to make production of brooms.

The trunk of the tree is covered by rings of very sharp spines, believed by some biologists to have evolved as protection against the extinct Megatherium Giant Ground Sloth.

External links
 Astrocaryum aculeatissimum photos

aculeatissimum
Endemic flora of Brazil
Flora of the Atlantic Forest
Trees of Brazil
Fiber plants
Medicinal plants of South America
Least concern plants
Least concern biota of South America